The Golte Ski Resort is a Slovenian ski resort just above Mozirje in the Kamnik–Savinja Alps. The closest city is Velenje. There is hiking and mountain biking in the area in the summer.

Resort statistics
Elevation
Summit: 
Base:  

Ski terrain
 - covering  of ski slopes on one mountain.

Slope difficulty
- Expert  
- Intermediate 
- Beginner 

Vertical drop
-  in total

Longest run: FIS Veleslalom 

Average winter daytime temperature: 

Average annual snowfall: 

Lift capacity: 6,300 skiers per hour (altogether)

Ski season opens: December

Ski season ends: March

Snow conditions phone line: +386 0 (4) 5747100

Ski lifts

External links
 golte.si - official site

Ski areas and resorts in Slovenia